3-D Ultra NASCAR Pinball is a racing video game released in 1998 for Windows and Macintosh, and is the fourth game in 3-D Ultra Pinball video game series. It was also released under the title 3-D Ultra Pinball: Turbo Racing. The game received the Everyone rating from the Entertainment Software Rating Board. The game uses an improved graphics engine from the previous 3-D Ultra Pinball titles, which takes advantage of greater color depth and resolution up to 800x600 pixels. On the game's CD, the publishers have added texts and videos about NASCAR races.

Gameplay 
Up to four players play a virtual pinball simulation with a NASCAR theme.

Players can play a full season of races as Dale Earnhardt, Bobby Labonte, Terry Labonte or Bill Elliott.
Play begins with a mini game in which the player can improve their car for the race. This is followed by a qualifying lap which determines the players starting position in the race. When the race begins, players have up to 5 balls or until a timer ends to finish the race. Missing too many targets will force the player to play a pit stop mini game, which can repair their vehicle for the rest of the race. The player finishing position in each race is tracked across an entire NASCAR season.

Reception 
Game reviews were generally positive with the average rating over 60%.

Reviews 
3-D Ultra NASCAR Pinball is a good, solidly-constructed game that is fun to play. - GameZilla

5 out of 10. - HappyPuppy

An enjoyable experience. 70% - GameOver Game Reviews

See also 
NASCAR Racing

References

External links 
 3-D Ultra NASCAR Pinball Demo on Archive.org

1998 video games
Classic Mac OS games
NASCAR video games
Pinball video games
Video games developed in the United States
Windows games
Multiplayer and single-player video games
Dynamix games